Euros is a genus of moths of the family Noctuidae.

Species
 Euros cervina (H. Edwards, 1890)
 Euros proprius H. Edwards, 1881
 Euros osticollis Troubridge, 2006

References
Natural History Museum Lepidoptera genus database
Euros at funet

Apameini